Red mangrove may refer to at least three plant species:
 Rhizophora mangle
 Rhizophora mucronata
 Rhizophora stylosa